Arina Rodionova and Valeriya Strakhova were the defending champions, but both players chose not to participate.

Guadalupe Pérez Rojas and Daniela Seguel won the title, defeating Ágnes Bukta and Vivien Juhászová in the final, 6–7(3–7), 6–3, [11–9].

Seeds

Draw

References
Main Draw

Nana Trophy - Doubles